Albert Marden (born 18 November 1934) is an American mathematician, specializing in complex analysis and hyperbolic geometry.

Education and career
Marden received his PhD in 1962 from Harvard University with thesis advisor Lars Ahlfors. Marden has been a professor at the University of Minnesota since the 1970s, where he is now professor emeritus. He was a member of the Institute for Advanced Study (IAS) in the academic year 1969–70, Fall 1978, and Fall 1987.

His research deals with Riemann surfaces, quadratic differentials, Teichmüller spaces, hyperbolic geometry of surfaces and 3-manifolds, Fuchsian groups, Kleinian groups, complex dynamics, and low-dimensional geometric analysis.

Concerning properties of hyperbolic 3-manifolds, Marden formulated in 1974 the tameness conjecture, which was proved in 2004 by Ian Agol and independently by a collaborative effort of Danny Calegari and David Gabai.

In 1962, he gave a talk (as an approved speaker but not an invited speaker) on A sufficient condition for the bilinear relation on open Riemann surfaces at the International Congress of Mathematicians in Stockholm. In 2012 he was elected a Fellow of the American Mathematical Society. His doctoral students include Howard Masur.

Selected publications

Articles
 
 with David B. A. Epstein: 
 with Troels Jørgensen: 
 with Burt Rodin: 
 with Daniel Gallo and Michael Kapovich: 
 with D. B. A. Epstein and  V. Markovic:

Books
 with Richard Canary and David B. A. Epstein (editors):

References

External links
 Homepage

20th-century American mathematicians
21st-century American mathematicians
Harvard University alumni
University of Minnesota faculty
Fellows of the American Mathematical Society
Complex analysts
1934 births
Living people